Ganesh Bose (2 July 1905 – 1 November 1975) was an Indian cricketer. He played eleven first-class matches for Bengal between 1930 and 1943.

See also
 List of Bengal cricketers

References

External links
 

1905 births
1975 deaths
Indian cricketers
Bengal cricketers
Cricketers from Kolkata